TOETAG INC is an American Independent horror film company based in Pittsburgh, Pennsylvania. The company was founded by director Fred Vogel and special effects artist Jerami Cruise, specializing in producing and distributing low-budget underground horror films. In 2004, Cruise created the special effects department for TOETAG Pictures, TOETAG SFX, that would go on to work on TOETAG Pictures films as well as independent productions. The company gained its notoriety for its film series, August Underground. In 2010 TOETAG INC officially became incorporated and changed its name from TOETAG Pictures to TOETAG INC. Then in 2014 the company added a releasing department to distribute films from other creators called TOETAG Releasing.

Pre-TOETAG PICTURES

Before TOETAG pictures was founded, director Fred Vogel and special effects artist Jerami Cruise both attended the same university, the Art Institute of Pittsburgh, and began shooting underground short films with a focus on gore and violence. It wasn't until the duo graduated from university that they teamed up to make the first August Underground film in 2001.

History
TOETAG pictures was founded after the creation of August Underground's Mordum in 2002. With the success of August Underground and the sequel, TOETAG Pictures was able to lease their first studio in Bellevue, Pennsylvania. Parts of the studio can be seen in the pseudo-documentary S&Man. With the continued success of TTP, the company was able to open a 7,000 sq ft studio in Pittsburgh. The team would go on to make seven films under the name TOETAG Pictures before rebranding to TOETAG INC in 2010. Within the same year the company lost its studio in Pittsburgh.  Even though the TTP studio was gone, the company would go on to work in SFX on Theater Bizarre (segment  “Wet Dream”), White Reindeer (2013 film), and Fractured (2013 film).
By 2012, Jerami Cruise moved TOETAG SFX department to Los Angeles, California. The company also opened a storefront in 2013 in Pittsburgh, Pennsylvania. By 2014 TOETAG INC created TOETAG Releasing which went on to distribute four films, ‘’Arme/Lust’’, ‘’Cross Bearer’’, ‘’I Am No One’’, and ‘’Deadwood Park’’. Currently, the TOETAG Inc, TOETAG SFX, and TOETAG Releasing have been on hiatus since 2015.

TOETAG PICTURES

TOETAG EFX

TOETAG Releasing

References

External links
 
 Article at Variety

Film production companies of the United States